The 2019–20 season is Tai Po's 12th season in the top-tier division in Hong Kong football. Tai Po will compete in the Premier League, Senior Challenge Shield, FA Cup, Sapling Cup and AFC Cup this season. However, due to the 2020 coronavirus pandemic in Hong Kong, Tai Po announced their withdrawal from the remaining matches this season in May 2020. On 12 June 2020, Tai Po confirmed their withdrawal from participating in the new HKPL season.

Squad

First team
As of 22 March 2020

LP
FP
 (on loan from Kitchee)
  FP

 FP

 FP

 FP
 (on loan from Kitchee)
 FP

Remarks:
LP These players are registered as local players in Hong Kong domestic football competitions. 
FP These players are registered as foreign players.

Transfers

Transfers in

Transfers out

Loans In

Loans Out

Team staff

Competitions

Hong Kong Premier League

Table

Hong Kong Senior Challenge Shield

Hong Kong Sapling Cup

Group stage

Hong Kong FA Cup

Remarks

References

Hong Kong football clubs 2019–20 season